Boyer Flight Park  is a public use ultralight airport in Carroll County, Indiana, United States. It is located four nautical miles (7 km) southwest of the central business district of Burnettsville, a town in White County.

Facilities and aircraft 
Boyer Flight Park covers an area of 7 acres (3 ha) at an elevation of 710 feet (216 m) above mean sea level. It has one runway designated 18/36 with a turf surface measuring 1,770 by 120 feet (539 x 37 m).

For the 12-month period ending December 31, 2010, the airport had 218 general aviation aircraft operations, an average of 18 per month. There are two ultralight aircraft based at this airport.

See also 
 List of airports in Indiana

References

External links 
 Aerial image from USGS The National Map

Airports in Carroll County, Indiana
Ultralight aviation